Brinkmannella elongata is a species of deepwater cardinalfish known to occur in deep waters of the Atlantic Ocean around the Bahamas.  This species is the only known member of its genus.

References

Epigonidae
Monotypic fish genera
Fish described in 1933